This article is a list of fictional characters in the manga series .

Humans

The current human incarnation of the Organic Angel, Alexiel. He is sixteen-years-old and is a troubled high school student with a crowd of friends who are considered bad people. He was rejected by his mother because he was "different" and lives with his absent father. He regularly visits with his younger sister, Sara, although secretly. He is hopelessly in love with Sara, a fact that fills him with guilt, but he later decides that she is more important than anything. Though dormant inside him, Alexiel retains many of her high astral powers and Setsuna is almost impervious to injury. Setsuna's semi-effeminate appearance ironically resembles Rosiel's original form to the point that Katan called Setsuna "Rosiel". Like all of Alexiel's reincarnations, Setsuna was doomed to live a miserable life and die a slow, painful death. However, the cycle is partially broken when Nanatsusaya kills Alexiel's previous incarnation. It is then completely destroyed when Sara dies in his place. He also has no memories of his previous incarnations, and at first resents his role as the chosen "Savior", wishing only to protect his and Sara's happiness. He matures as the series progresses, eventually surpassing Alexiel herself. Setsuna is headstrong, rebellious, and impulsive, but he has a good heart and is fiercely loyal to his friends.

The younger sister of Setsuna and the reincarnation of the soul of the former Great Cherub, Jibril (Gabriel). Jibril was also one of the Four Elemental Angels, the Angel of Water, and she vocally opposed Sevotharte's violent actions as Prime Minister. To get Jibril out of the way, he paralyzed her with a needle and sent her soul to Earth, so that she could unwittingly serve him as Setsuna's guardian angel. Sara lives with their mother, who favors her more, but Sara secretly visits with her brother. Sara is truly in love with her brother, Setsuna. When Sara dies, her soul is taken up to heaven by Zaphikel to study its unusual spiritual energy signature. Metatron removes Sevy's needle from the back of Jibril's neck and Sara's soul awakens in it. She awakens blind and remains so until she is healed when she uses Jibril's water powers to help Raphael revive Setsuna. Her soul was returned to her original body by Raphael, who claims to love her. This is not true, for through Sara, Raphael was to realise that his true love was someone else close to him. Sara has a pure, innocent heart, but she has a fierce temper and sharp tongue.

When Sakuya was six years old, he died in a car accident with his mother. However, the spirit of Alexiel's seven-bladed Holy Sword Nanatsusaya saves him. The two made a deal: the spirit of the sword is in control of Sakuya's body, but will grow smart and read lots of books, and Sakuya made the sword promise to make his father hate him so that when Sakuya dies, his father will feel no grief. Within Sakuya resides the soul of the fallen angel Lucifer, which takes on the form of Nanatsusaya. The Sword has followed and protected Alexiel in every one of her lives because he loves her. Later, Lucifer was to reawaken but he retains memories of Kira Sakuya and Nanatsusaya. Despite his attempts to suppress these memories, he still regarded Setsuna as a friend. He uses a sword named Shiranui.

, Kazuki Yao (Drama CD, Asaih Arc)
Sakuya Kira's drug-dealing best friend - killed when Setsuna (under Alexiel's control) is tricked by Rosiel.
When he dies, Enra-Ou enlists his help to test (and preferably kill) the Messiah. While he and Setsuna do not get along initially, they become friends and defeat Enra-Ou. He acts as a guide to Setsuna while he is in Hades and dies in order for them to defeat Enra-Ou. He is then revived and given a new body by Uriel, going on to help Setsuna in the remaining story arcs. Initially a source of comic relief, Yue slowly becomes a tragic character as his new body begins to decay, particularly after being grievously hurt by Lucifer.

Drama voice by: Yuko Nagashima
Sara's shy classmate and best friend. She has a crush on Setsuna, though Setsuna considers her old-fashioned (due to her thick glasses).Ruri is chosen by Katan to be the last human sacrifice to free Rosiel. Setsuna, Sara, and Ruri are caught in the crossfire when Katan is attacked by Kurai; Setsuna chooses to protect Sara instead of Ruri, and it is the last thing she sees before she is blinded by shards of glass. Bitterly blaming Sara for her handicap, Ruri offers herself to Rosiel in exchange for killing Sara. When she helps reawaken Rosiel through the video game called Angel Sanctuary, He kills her and absorbs her body, taking her memories and form. He uses her physical appearance to capture Sara to use as bait for Setsuna. Later, Kirie uses what's left of Ruri's soul to try to kill Sara. Ruri manages to break free, and using the last of her strength, saves Sara from an attack from Kirie.

Mrs. Mudo

Setsuna and Sara's mother. When Setsuna was a small child, Mrs Mudo began to notice that he was under a mysterious protection that prevented him from falling ill or being injured in accidents. A strict Christian, Mrs. Mudo rejected her son, sensing that he was somehow "evil". Following her divorce from her husband, Mrs. Mudo takes great lengths to separate Setsuna from his sister, especially after she catches him kissing Sara in her sleep. Determined to sever the relationship between Setsuna and Sara, Mrs. Mudo makes plans to take Sara away to England and have her marry the son of a businessman. However, Setsuna catches them at the airport, where he confesses his undying love for Sara in front of them both. Sara leaves her tearful mother behind, and the two run away.

Angels

The Organic Angel Alexiel is the elder of the two twin angels. She was loved by the archangel Uriel and the fallen angel Lucifer, though she claims the one she loves most is God. In truth, the one she loved most was actually her twin brother, Rosiel; though not in the incestuous way that Sara and Setsuna love each other. She was one of the two highest angels in Heaven and has 3 wings.
Born from Adam Kadmon to love God, Alexiel rebels against him because of the love she has for Rosiel. She is forced to conceal her feelings under the threat that Rosiel would be killed the moment God heard any declarations of love from Alexiel to her brother. She is also sentenced to be confined in Briah, the Angel's Garden (Eden), and forced to eat the fruit of the Tree of Life. This act is damning her, because the tree is grown from part of Adam Kadmon's body - she is technically eating the flesh of her parent. It is also in Eden where Alexiel and Lucifer first meet. After God had revealed his fate to Lucifer, that he would be the purest form of evil in the world to make God himself appear greater, Lucifer wanted to take revenge by corrupting and killing God's "beloved" daughter. After speaking with her, he changes his mind and promises to break her out of Eden, which he later does. This, however leads to the erasing of his memories and imprisonment of his soul into Nanatsusaya, which Alexiel later finds and fights with.
When she seals Rosiel away, she is imprisoned and tried by the High Council for her actions. After lying that the one she loved most was God, Uriel sentences her body to be imprisoned in the angel crystal while her soul is endlessly reincarnated into a human without end; each of her lives are to be miserable and end in a painful death. Setsuna is the current incarnation of Alexiel, and has awakened as the savior, so he has access to all of Alexiel's powers. Throughout the series, there are a few times when Alexiel reawakens. When Setsuna falls into the river Lethe in hell, and at the end when Rosiel awakens as the angel of the apocalypse. The first time, she reveals Lucifer's identity to him, and the second time, she confesses her love to Rosiel, kills him, and absorbs his decaying body into her womb. There, her organic powers will constantly regenerate him, forever. She is the first of the creator's attempts to split the powers of the Seraphita.

, Nozomu Sasaki (Drama CD)
The Inorganic Angel Rosiel is the younger twin of Alexiel. Originally, he was wise, kind and benevolent, but knew he would eventually lose his sanity and become destructive. He asked Alexiel to kill him before this happened, but her feelings prevented her from doing so and she sealed him within the earth instead. He is also obsessed with his beauty; because everyone calls him beautiful (save for Alexiel), he frequently asks if he is beautiful as he descends further into insanity. In fact, he intentionally mimics many of Alexiel's facial features, which explains his resemblance to his sister. In reality, Rosiel was born as an old, hideous creature. His body doesn't age; instead, it becomes younger and younger as time goes by. Rosiel's most loyal follower Katan secretly uses forbidden black magic to break the seal and brings Rosiel back. By this time, Rosiel has already lost his mind.
Even with his determination to have Alexiel, he acknowledges on a subconscious level that he loves Katan more than anyone else in the world and occasionally shows this. In the final volume, Rosiel dies after killing his beloved servant Katan in a fit of madness. In his last moments, Alexiel awakens with Setsuna's help and helps Rosiel return to a temporary state of sanity. She reveals to him that she loved him as a brother all along. Rosiel realizes it is time he died and joined "the one he truly loves", Katan. He accepts death gratefully, but before he dies, though, he passes his powers onto Setsuna, giving three more wings to add to the three Setsuna already had, giving him a total of 6 wings, a trait once unique only to the "perfect" Holy Hermit Adam Kadmon.

Katan is one of the Cherubim. He was originally a Grigori, but was given a body by Rosiel before he expired. He worked to achieve the rank of Cherubim solely so that he could see Rosiel again. In a sense he is Rosiel's son, and he loves Rosiel deeply. He resurrected Rosiel in the hopes that he would take control of Heaven again and end the corrupt dictatorship. Unfortunately for Katan, this plan backfires, as Rosiel only cares about having Alexiel love him and tell him that he is beautiful. Unlike Kirie, Katan disapproves of many of Rosiel's actions, but he cannot bring himself to leave Rosiel's side. He considers himself already "damned" for sacrificing innocent human lives in the effort to resurrect Rosiel, so he continues his chosen path regardless of the consequences. At the Awakening of Setsuna, Katan was badly injured. Dying, Rosiel forces Katan to eat his wing, cursing Katan to one day lose his free will and become a mindless puppet of Rosiel's. Despite various cruelties and deliberate attempts by Rosiel to make him leave for his own protection, Katan stays out of love for Rosiel, and in the height of his insanity, Rosiel kills him. Right up to his death Katan continued to try to reach the remaining sanity in Rosiel and even as he died, he thought of Rosiel's suffering ahead of his own. However, their spirits are reunited after Rosiel's death.

Drama voice by: Jurouta Kosugi, Kaneto Shiozawa for Assiah Arc
Heaven's Prime Minister, Sevothtarte, rules while Rosiel is sealed. While he claims he is doing this in the name of God, he is actually pursuing his goals to "purify" Heaven. He is the guardian of the Great Seraphim Metatron, who should really be running Heaven. Sevothtarte is a cold and frightening dictator whose intentions are always hidden. Also, only his eyes can be seen, for he wears a veil and a helm. He's often at odds with Rosiel after the Inorganic Angel's return to Heaven.
It is revealed that he was actually  (Drama voice by: Masako Aizawa) in disguise. The helm was to hide Lailah's cross-shaped scar, while the veil was used to conceal her brand as a fallen angel and a mechanical device that changes her voice to that of a man's. Lailah was an angel scientist who was raped by a group of angels who were jealous of her success, thus transgressing the laws of Heaven. When another angel (NidHegg) comes to save her, she wounds him and frames him for the crime. The act made her 'impure' and she was branded a fallen angel. NidHegg was sentenced to having his wings cut off. Although she was in love with Zaphikel, he was with her best friend, Anael, so she could never have him. Before she was found out, Lailah believed wholly in the purity of Heaven, and this is why Sevothtarte attempts to purify heaven. After she is branded and disgraced, she sells herself to Sandalphon in order to be reborn into something pure.
During the trial of Djibril/Sara Mudo, Uriel and Raphael turn on him and expose him as a fake. In truth the real Sevothtarte died in the war while Lailah assumed his identity. When the court room collapses Sevothtarte/Lailah loses his/her mask and Setsuna sees the true "Sevothtarte". Sandalphon finds Lailah in a room of dead soldiers and drives her insane by showing her visions of what she did to Zaphikel. He then rapes her and impregnates her, hoping the child she bears will be his new body. She is then imprisoned in a tower with only one window for punishment and her astral powers are sealed so that she can't fly away. The spirit of NidHegg then visits Lilah to tell her that he still loves her, even though she hated him. As he turns to leave, Lailah sees the blood on the back of his shirt where his wings were taken off. She then jumps out of the tower, holding NidHegg, to her death. Later on, their spirits visit Metatron when he is close to death from a wound from Lucifer, and they seem to be happy together and finally at peace.

, Drama voice by: Taeko Kawata, Satomi Koorogi for Assiah Arc
The Great Seraphim Metatron is a young child who adores Sevothtarte/Lailah and calls 'him' Sevy. To him, she is his mother figure, and he has vague memories of her when she sung him to sleep as Lailah. His twin brother is Sandalphon, who has never existed as anything other than a mass of flesh and eyeballs in what is called the 'Cradle.' He is the result of an experiment to replicate the powers of the Seraphita. He has no wings and seemingly no powers, but his twin brother's soul resides inside of him. Despite his apparent lack of powers, Metatron is actually the only one capable of keeping Sandalphon in check, for he is the cap and seal of Sandalphon and his powers. To prevent Sandalphon's awakening, Lailah had Metatron consume pills. But when Metatron is removed from her care, the sister in charge does not see to this, and Sandalphon takes over Metatron's body. After Sandalphon is driven out, Metatron is mortally wounded by Lucifer in order to kill Sandalphon's true form, but he is miraculously revived and saved after having a visit from Sevy's spirit that proves that Sevy loves him. He says that her warm touch was more real than the throne of heaven.

Drama voice by: Tomokazu Seki
The 'Angel of the Apocalypse' and the 'Nightmare Eater'. He is Metatron's younger twin brother and usually manipulates Metatron's toy rabbit, but his soul resides in Metatron. When Metatron is removed from Sevothtarte's care, Sandalphon takes advantage of the opportunity and possesses him, revealing his intentions for Lailah to be his mother so that he can have a true, separate body, and sees to raping her after he drives her insane. He loves Lailah because she sang to him in his 'cradle' and hates her because after he gave her a new life as Sevothtarte, she sealed him away. After she died, he possesses Sara and plans for her to be his mother. He had millions of various eyes and mouths and has six wings coming from his head. Sandalphon's ability is that he invades dreams and uses them against his victims. By 'eating' their nightmares and showing them their fondest dreams, he steals their souls and drives them insane. He claims that he and his brother never matured because God created him so that he could destroy the universe with the "raw cruelty of a child."

Drama voice by: Hideyuki Tanaka
Zaphikel is a high-ranked angel (Chief of the Thrones) and leader of a rebellion group called Anima Mundi, which plans to overthrow Sevothtarte. He fell in love with Anael and promised to quit his job, which was killing "White Rabbits" (the children of angels [Angels do not have a complete set of DNA so their children are born pale and have red eyes]) after he learns that Anael is going to have his child. When Sevothtarte found out about their relations, he had Zaphikel kill Anael. Later, he was sentenced to kill himself, an ordeal that was to leave a deep scar around his neck. He is blinded by Adam Kadmon when the Seraphita appeared to save him. His assistant is Raziel. Initially, Zaphikel had no idea that Raziel was his son. He is sentenced to have his wings cut off when he is revealed as the leader of the Anima Mundi. Upon Raziel's breaking into his cell to rescue him, he has already degenerated to a ghoul. Just before his death, Adam Kadmon restores his sight and he sees his dead love in his child's face. He then passes his post of leadership to Raziel, who then raised his gun to kill a berserking Zaphikel.

Drama voice by: Yurika Hino
Anael was Zaphikel's lover. She disapproved of his slaughtering of the Ion Children (bastard angel babies), but she fell in love with him anyway. Her best friend is Lailah, who (as Sevothtarte) deceives Zaphikel into killing Anael. During the time she was alive, she was becoming more and more afraid of the "demon research" that she was conducting at the orders of the High Council. Thus she contacted the rebel forces and leaked them info and vice versa. She started supervising a project called, "Project Sandolphon", a project that Zaphikel has chosen to continue.

, Ryoutarou Okiayu (Drama voice) 
The Six Winged being who first "gave birth" to Alexiel and Rosiel, thus dividing his power between them. (In truth God created them from the body of Adam Kadmon) And by the end of the story the only physical thing left of him is his Head. (Body made into Alexiel and Rosiel, his "evil" Left Eye was planted and the Tree of Life grew from it.) On earth, he appears as an "After Image", asking Setsuna to free him before God realizes his transgression. Setsuna does free him, but this is an imposter, who only cares for destruction. The real Kadmon exists as the tree of life, meaning that as each angel is born they in fact eating him, a major crime among angels. He unlike his creator displays love and affection for all things, working in secret to create peace and end the war between heaven and hell.

Drama voice by: Sho Hayami
The Archangel of Earth, Angel of Justice and Angel of Death, a former member of the Seven Great Angels and an Angel of the rank of Thrones. His wings are of a dark brown, nearly black, like the earth. He used to love Alexiel and was the one who sentenced her to her gruesome punishment. This made him go slightly mad with grief and he ripped out his vocal cords (he had the power to vocalize a curse, making it come true) to atone for the sins he committed against his love. He finds that this is not enough and leaves heaven to live in Hades where he fashions a dragon's body for NidHegg and fashions a body for Kirie's soul when she arrives in Hades. (He called her "Doll".) He also created a living-mechanical body for Kato and acts like a father to him later in the story. Because Uriel is feels bad about damning souls to hell, he fashions a mask for himself, and when he wears it, all his feelings of kindness and conscience are suppressed so that he can be cruel and ruthless as the Angel of Death. When Setsuna comes to him searching for Sara's soul, Uriel says he has been waiting for Alexiel's soul, and begs Setsuna to behead him with his own scythe and cast him into hell to atone for his judgment on Alexiel. However, Setsuna refuses and says that instead, if he still wants to atone, Uriel's punishment will be to go on living with the knowledge of what he did. Later, having sorted out his thoughts, he attaches a mechanical device to his neck, amplifying the vibrations of his throat to form an audible voice.

Drama voice by: Naozumi Takahashi
The Archangel of Fire, who also holds the title of being the Chief of the Powers. He is the Shining General of Heaven's Armies. He has a fiery temper and his most distinguishing feature is a tattoo of a dragon going all the way up from his chest to the middle of his face. He hates it when you talk about two things: 1. His height (he's dreadfully short) and 2. His taller twin brother...Lucifer. His best friend is Raphael and he rarely ever understands what really is going on (except in battles). He is the second of the creator's attempts to split the powers of the Seraphita and has two wings, while Lucifer has four. Michael's small stature is due to the fact that his astral powers developed very quickly—an angel only ages until their astral power is mature, then they stop—thus Michael is stuck in a young body.
He resents Lucifer because from birth on, everyone presumed that Lucifer would be the twin to rise to fame and glory. Michael was forced to stand in his shadow. Though he tells himself he hates Lucifer for this, what really tortures him is that deep inside, even he loves and respects Lucifer and only wants his brother to acknowledge him.
When Michael and Lucifer were born, a prophecy foretold that one of twins would be the harbinger of destruction but the other would be the child of Light. Everyone though Michael to be the former and Lucifer to be the Light-bringer, especially after Lucifer's ascension to the post of the Morning Star, one of the highest levels of the Angel hierarchy. Ironically, in the end it is revealed that Lucifer is the prince of darkness and Michael the Angel of Light.
This turns out to be a double-edged sword, however. After Lucifer's rebellion, Michael's soul burns so brightly with rage that anyone who tries to approach him is incinerated. Only Raphael would approach him and was able to save him from himself.

 Drama voice by: Ken Narita
The Archangel of Wind and Chief of the Virtues. The greatest healer alive and the only one with the power to truly bring back the dead. He is lecherous and agrees to bring Setsuna back to life only if Sara will sleep with him. He falls in love with her, but does not pursue her because Sara loves Setsuna. But later he comes to realize that his true love is actually Barbiel, his second-in-command. He used up his powers to save her during the Battle of Etenamenki and in return has to go into "hibernation" or "cold sleep" for 10 years.
The reason Raphael womanizes is actually because he hates women. This stems from his former deputy, Belial, who, before falling and becoming one of the Seven Satans, introduces him to his own denied desires for carnal pleasures and humiliates him in the eyes of all the angels after her lewd acts are exposed. Sara helps him resolve this, which is one of the reasons he comes to love her.
He is also best friends with Archangel of Fire, Michael. He told Sara that after the incident with Belial he was shunned by everyone except Michael. Michael just continued to act as if nothing was different and considering how Michael seems oblivious to anything that happens in Heaven that doesn't involve warfare he may have indeed not known what was going on. Michael's personality comforted Raphael, he says that "He pulled me to life from all those years and months of desolation." Raphael has also stated that he can not forgive the one thing that changes Michael into a different person, Lucifer.

Once the Chief of the Cherubim, Djibril was rendered comatose and imprisoned in the Water Garden by Sevothtarte. Her soul was forced to be Alexiel's guardian angel, and was reincarnated into Sara Mudo because Sevothtarte saw her as an obstacle in his path to absolute power. She is the Archangel of Water and is known to humans (as Raphael says) as Gabriel. Sara awakens in her body when a needle in the back of Djibril's neck is removed and remains in Djibril's body throughout a trial engineered by Sevothtarte to get rid of both Sara and Djibril. After Raphael restores Sara to her own body, Djibril's soulless body is placed in the Water Garden again. Djibril was one of the few angels to see the Grigori and be aware of their suffering; she cried for their hopeless plight.

Drama voice by: Hiroki Takahashi
Temporarily acts in Djibril's stead as the Chief of the Cherubim, because he was the second-in-command to Djibril. He is now nothing more than Sevothtarte's pawn, and when he attempts to assassinate Rosiel, he almost dies and gets turned into one of Rosiel's mindless puppets. Later, when Rosiel starts to lose his sanity, Dobiel was to break down into useless parts.

The Chief of the Principalities - in charge of the "Mid-Air Corridor" (which is between the 4th and 5th levels of Heaven and is where fallen angels are imprisoned). He has an Evil Eye, who can kill beings of lesser will outright, or control the bodies of others. He is killed by Zaphikel when Zaphikel, despite going insane and becoming a ghoul, manages to regain control of himself and pierces Sariel's eye. (Due to his blindness, he is immune to the powers of Sariel's eye.)

Drama voice by: Mayumi Yanagisawa
The second-in-command to Raphael. While she was initially a sisterly figure to Raphael, she later becomes his lover. She is almost killed trying to save Raphael, but he uses up much of his powers to save her, rendering him unconscious.

Drama voice by: Mika Kanai
A former candidate for the "Archangels Think Tank" and loves Rosiel because he was the only one to approach her without discrimination to her gender and because he says he is in love with her. Kirie comes down on Earth to help Rosiel kill Sara. She is hot-tempered and naive, and refuses to listen to Katan's warnings about Rosiel's true manipulative nature. She is killed in the blast of energy when Setsuna awakens as the Messiah/Alexiel and destroys the world after Sara is killed. Later, her soul travels to Hades where she is found by Uriel. Though her soul currently resides in the body of Doll, she has no memories as Kirie.

Drama voice by: Yuu Asakawa, Hiro Yuuki
A candidate for "Archangels' Think Tank" who is working under Zaphikel. He is an I-Child, the product of a forbidden union between angels, and was the subject of brutal experiments before being rescued by Zaphikel. Unlike most I-Children, who are nicknamed "rabbits" for their red eyes, Raziel's eyes only turn red when he uses his special astral powers. Raziel is an empath, able to sense and manipulate the emotions of others. He is given a job to survey the slums in heaven and there he meets Sheatiel and falls in love with her. He begs Sevothtarte to help her and all the Ion Children in the slums, and Sevy agrees. But, all the food and toys he gave Raziel to give to Sheatiel and the Ions were really bombs. When he breaks into the Endless Corridor to rescue Zaphikel, only to find him a ghoul. It is revealed by Adam Kadmon that he is Zaphikel and Anael's child, thought dead. When Zaphikel dies, he takes over the Anima Mundi. As leader, he tries to form an alliance with the forces of Hell against Rosiel, but this offer was rejected outright by Belial.

Drama voice by: Rie Kugimiya
A former grigori that was turned into a "Sister" by Sevothtarte to take care of Sara after awakening in Djibril's body. She is a "Staker", a sister who has been lobotomized so that she will not disobey the orders of her masters. Thus, she has a very childlike personality and is very fearful of Sevothtarte. Initially she was only called "Sister" until she brings Sara a bouquet of Moonlilies, she remarks that they are her favorite. So Sara names her Moonlil after the flower and Moonlil has since nicknamed herself "Lil-chan" as a result. When Sara (as Djibril) escapes before her trial, Sevothtarte holds Moonlil captive in order to lure Sara back.

/
Drama voice by: Akiko Yajima
An angel who can read minds. She ate a dead angel's flesh so that she wouldn't die of starvation upon the angel's urging, and thus was condemned as fallen. She was taken to Katan by Rosiel to be eaten, but instead befriends him after she tells him that she also has eaten angel flesh. She is killed during Dobbiel's assassination attempt on Rosiel.

A one winged angel. Because of her deformity, she does not "fit in" with the "pure", "holy" angels in the upper heavens, so she stays with the bastard children to watch over them and protect the little ones. One other mentionable thing about her is that it is hinted that she was raped by higher ranking angels who decided to "use" angels like her for their own needs. She lives in the slums of Heaven, where she meets Raziel. She falls in love with him, and he brings her a necklace when he brings all the food and toys for the Ion children. She is killed by the bombs and her head is blown off her body because the necklace was also a bomb. She is buried by Raziel before the "clean-up crew" comes to get rid of the organic waste.

Demons

He is also the twin brother to the angel Michael. Just when he was exalted to the position of Morning Star, he was told by God that he was born with only one reason - to become the Prince of Darkness and rule the evils and demons. Angry with this revelation, he decided to go rape Alexiel in order to enrage God since in Heaven, it was believed that Alexiel was actually God's "beloved daughter". The reality was that god actually only used her and wanted her out of the way so he could follow though his plan; Lucifer had no way of knowing this. However, he fell in love with her when he found out she was not the cold emotionless woman everyone believed her to be, but a woman who loved everything with a love that encompassed anything Lucifer had seen. He fell in love with the "woman with the same eyes as him". He leaves Eden after kissing her and continues to stage a rebellion against God.
When he and his comrades fell, they found that hell was a barren land incapable of supporting life of any kind, so he rooted his body to Hell's ground, merging with it in order to make Hell habitable. Thus when Hell's earth breaks, it is his blood that gushes out. He later returns to Eden a second time to free Alexiel from her God-made prison, and thus assisted in bringing forth the second rebellion, which Alexiel staged.
As his punishment for assisting Alexiel's escape from Eden, God extracts his soul and imprisons it in a seven-bladed sword, Nanatsusaya Mitamanatsurugi. His soul was imprisoned in the sword for so long, he forgot all his memories. A number of people tried to wield the sword and failed until Alexiel came along. He allowed her to control him, because she was the woman that held all his memories in her hand. As Nanatsusaya, Lucifer hated Alexiel because he was helpless as she knew more about him than he did and she would never reveal his past to him. But when Alexiel was captured by the angels and sealed in the Angel Crystal, Nanatsusaya followed her through all her reincarnations. He deludes himself into thinking that it is because he hates her and wants to see her suffer, but in the end his actions prove otherwise.

The 14th and last princess of the Gehennan Royal Family, and believes herself to be the only survivor of her family. She is master of the Shinryuu, three dragon oracles and various dragon "gods" who protect Gehenna. The master is declared heir to Gehenna's throne, regardless of the fact that Kurai had older brothers who could have inherit the throne instead. She believes Arachne is her cousin, though in truth she is her older sibling. Kurai is in love with Alexiel for saving her and helping her kingdom in the war against Heaven. She later loves Setsuna. After Setsuna's return to Earth, she resolved to be a good queen to her people.

, Rika Matsumoto (Drama CD)
Arachne is actually Kurai's older sibling and was told that she was heir to the throne. When Gehenna was attacked and destroyed, she discovers that she was only a decoy to protect the true heir, Kurai. She initially despises Kurai and sells her soul to Lucifer through the Mad Hatter... who seals a spider demon in her chest. She then poses as her cousin to get close to her and kill her, but grows to genuinely care for her. She is responsible for Boyz's death when Boyz finds out who Arachne really is. She sacrifices herself to be the 999th bride of The Demon Lord to save Kurai.
Arachne almost always dresses as a woman and refers to herself "one of God's mistakes", a woman trapped in a man's body. Voiced by P.M. Lewis in the English dub OAV.

Drama voice by: Daisuke Kishio
Also known as Voice, he is the twin brother to Noyz. Boyz is an impulsive young demon with only one wing. He is in love with Kurai; he rejects Setsuna partly out of jealousy, and partly because he despises all angels and humans. Boyz is responsible for the death of Setsuna's human body; he accidentally removes the Nanatsusaya from his chest, forcing Setsuna's soul to return to Alexiel's preserved body. Boyz loses an arm during a violent scuffle with Michael, and grudgingly accepts Setsuna as the savior after he saves his life. He is given an artificial arm, but is killed by Arachne after he stumbles upon his shrine to Lucifer.

Drama voice by: Junko Noda
Also known as Noise, she is the twin sister to Boyz, and a close friend of Kurai's. Noyz is a demon, and she has one black wing. Noyz and her brother were orphaned when the Angels attacked Anagura; as a result, they both have an intense hatred of angels, and the humans who are polluting their homeland. When Boyz is killed, Noyz cuts her hair in order to resemble him more closely.

Drama voice by: Mizuki Saito
It is said that all who look at Prince Abaddon die instantly. Kurai was one of those exceptions, because she was wearing one of Setsuna's earrings on a necklace, and Abaddon was to acknowledge her as his "mother". He is of noble blood, but he was chained in the deepest dungeon in Hell under the care of Astaroth when Lucifer's soul disappeared. He escapes and crashes Kurai's wedding to Lucifer. Abaddon dies protecting her from the collapsing chapel.

Seven Sins

Drama voice by: Yōko Sōmi
One of the Seven Satans, "Pride", and the Court Jester of the lowest layer of Hell, Sheol. (They were the reason why Raphael disliked women, due to their ways.) Belial searches for and chooses Lucifer's brides, because they love Lucifer himself. However, they do not long for him to love them back because if he does their love will die and they will hate him. They (like all angels) was born sexless, but when their gender started to manifest they took pills to stop it so that they could be the best of what God had intended for him to be: "Worthless." Thus, while technically female, they have the flat chest and slim hips of a young man, and is in fact mistaken as a male by Kurai. They have a tattoo of a butterfly on their upper thigh, which also gives them the nickname "The Mad Butterfly." They also have a habit of taunting Setsuna and his friends, particularly Sakuya, for he has another identity that he doesn't know: Lucifer, Ruler of the 9 Hells. Later, after Setsuna's destruction of God, he was to withdraw the forces of Hell away from Heaven, thus forming a truce between the two realms.

One of the Seven Satans, "Sloth", and formerly a member of Thrones. He (Astaroth) has the soul of his sister  inside of him, because he is an attempt to create another Adam Kadmon, this drives him slowly insane and makes him cruel. To alleviate this crisis, Lucifer used his power to separate Astaroth and Astarte, such that when Astaroth's soul occupied their body, Astarte's soul dwelled in a white snake; and when Astarte took control of the body, Astaroth's soul entered a black snake. Astaroth is Prince Abaddon's caretaker when Lucifer's soul disappears. Later, when Abaddon fatally injures Astarte, she separated her body from her brother's, thus saving him. Though Astoreth claims not to be grateful for this act, he still wept when Belial tells him to "mourn for his sister".

One of the Seven Satans, "Lust", formerly a member of the Cherubim. He is in love with the Mad Hatter, and frequently tries to convince her to overthrow Lucifer with him. He has three heads. They are that of a human, a bull, and a lamb. Asmodeus is a notable womanizer and helps get Setsuna (in the body of Alexiel) to Kurai and Lucifer's wedding to annoy the Mad Hatter and Lucifer.

One of the Seven Satans, the Golden Count, "Avarice", formerly a member of the Angels. He was constantly staring down at heaven's golden roads, that is why he was cast out. Mammon has the head of a raven, and he sometimes takes that form. He makes a few small cameos in the story, speaking only once when discussing wedding presents with Asmodeus.

One of the Seven Satans, Lord of Flies, "Gluttony", formerly a member of the Seraphim. He is not seen in the manga storyline.

The Seven Satan of "Envy". He was once an angel who sheds his angel-hood and dons the cloth of a great sea-dragon. The Leviathan never makes dealings with any of the other Satans because he has reverted to believing himself to be a dragon and therefore acts like one. He is not seen in the manga storyline.

Drama voice by: Rumi Kasahara)
One of the Seven Satans, "Wrath", she is Lucifer's first wife and mother of many demons and Abbadon. Barbelo was once an angel in Heaven named Baru. She watched over Lucifer (Lucifel) and Michael when Lucifer still resided in Heaven. During the First Great War, she forced Michael to take her to the battlefield so she could see the fight for herself and that it was really Lucifer leading the army. When Michael went to attack Lucifer, she got in the way and was cut down by Michael's sword. After the fight, Lucifer saved her life and made her the Satan of Wrath.
However, she retains memories of her life as an angel, as well as a scar where Michael had injured her. Initially, Michael did not know that she survived his blow. But as Lucifer started dropping hints to him, Michael finally figured out who she was. He then struck her down a second time, as she was holding onto Setsuna's leg to prevent him from escaping.

Other

Drama voice by: Takuya Kirimoto
He was a scientist alongside Lailah & Anael. He fell in love with Lailah; and his love for her never wavered, even when she accused him of being one of her rapists. He has his wings cut off, and when Uriel flees to hell, he takes pity on NidHegg and fashions him a body like that of a dragon to ferry him around Hades. He asks Setsuna to find Lailah and give her one of his scales, as well as the message that he forgives her for what she did to him because he always loved her. (The scale later changed into a musical box of sorts, with Lailah's beautiful voice recorded as she sings.) After the journey, NidHegg's wishes are fulfilled (by him appearing before Lailah... in ghost form) and Lailah ends up jumping out of a window to fly to him, but her astral powers were limited so she just plunges to her death in happiness.

A being who is the composite of every living human to ever had died. He rules over Hades as Lucifer and God rule over Hell and Heaven respectively. He tests the Savior (Setsuna) and with that test he loses most of his contained souls. He employed Kato to kill Setsuna and take his astral powers during this test.

Drama voice by: Mika Kanai
An artificial human made by Uriel to be his lone companion in Hades. Doll's soul is actually that of Kirie's; ironically, her physical appearance is modelled after Sara, the girl she murdered, though Doll has no memories of her previous incarnation. Doll is devoted to Uriel, and loves making him tea and sweets.

Drama voice by: Jōji Nakata
A being from somewhere else. He has no real physical form, but resides in Etamenanki in the form of a giant computer-robot. The entire universe was created just to test an equation that he had fashioned, and he cares nothing for the suffering and injustice endured by humans and angels alike. He created Adam Kadmon in order for Adam Kadmon to "step-in" whenever he (God) was "sleeping".
In the end he is defeated by Setsuna with the help of Lucifer. Whether or not he was "killed" is never revealed, but since the universe did not cease to exist upon his defeat, it is clear that the unconscious mind of YHWH is still functioning.

References

https://web.archive.org/web/20070522215703/http://www.h5.dion.ne.jp/~susumu/rev_cd_tenkin.htm - Voice acting cast of the drama CDs 

Angel Sanctuary